Laxmannia squarrosa is a species of Laxmannia, a genus of tufted perennial herbs in the family Asparagaceae, subfamily Lomandroideae, which is endemic to Western Australia. From 0.03 to 0.1 m high, it grows on gravel and lateritic sand, and its white flowers may be seen from September to November.

References

squarrosa
Endemic flora of Western Australia
Taxa named by John Lindley
Plants described in 1840